The People, Yes is a book-length poem written by Carl Sandburg and published in 1936. The 300 page work is thoroughly interspersed with references to American culture, phrases, and stories (such as the legend of Paul Bunyan). Published at the height of the Great Depression, the work lauds the perseverance of the American people in notably plain-spoken language. It was written over an eight-year period. It is Sandburg’s last major book of poetry.

References

1936 poetry books
1936 poems
Poetry by Carl Sandburg
Epic poems in English
American poetry books